Dynamite was a magazine for children founded by Jenette Kahn and published by Scholastic Inc. from 1974 until 1992.  The magazine changed the fortunes of the company, becoming the most successful publication in its history and inspiring four similar periodicals for Scholastic, Bananas, Wow, Hot Dog! and Peanut Butter. Kahn edited the first three issues of Dynamite.  The next 109 issues were edited by Jane Stine, wife of children's author R. L. Stine (who is famous for writing the children's horror fiction novel series Goosebumps), followed by Linda Williams Aber (aka "Magic Wanda").  The writer-editor staff was future children's book writer Ellen Weiss, future novelist-lawyer Alan Rolnick and future screenwriter-playwright Mark Saltzman. The first issue, Dynamite #1, was dated March 1974 and featured the characters Hawkeye and Radar from the television series M*A*S*H.  The final issue, Dynamite #165, was dated March 1992 and featured actress Julia Roberts and Austrian actor Arnold Schwarzenegger.

Description 

Dynamite magazine served as an activity book each month, offering tricks, recipes, games, and contests. It also served as a monthly update on pop culture. Dynamite magazine was available through subscription, in limited quantities at newsstands, and through monthly orders circulated by school teachers using Scholastic's Arrow Book Club.

In 1984, Scholastic Inc. reduced the number of color pages and lowered the publication rate from twelve monthly issues of Dynamite per year to six (and subsequently five) issues per year. Editors developed more features about teen idols in the late 1980s and early 1990s, with cover stories on Johnny Depp, Alyssa Milano, Corey Haim, Corey Feldman, and rapper Will Smith, along with two 8 x 11 mini-posters per issue. Features from the later years included the Dynamite Activity Center, Dynamite Puzzle Pages, and spooky stories by R. L. Stine (aka Jovial Bob Stine), who would later create the Goosebumps series in the 1990s.

Features and format 

Dynamites features included "Magic Wanda", a how-to guide to selected magic tricks; "Bummers", an emphasis of children's one-line woes, which would start with the words: "Don't you hate it when..."; "And Now a Word from Our Sponsor" a commercial parody in comic form; the puzzle pages of the ghoulish Count Morbida; "Hot Stuff," a section featuring gags and new items in stores; the birth and growth of a horse called Foxy Fiddler; reprinted origin stories on Marvel and DC superheroes (and later the comic superheroes the "Dynamite Duo"); and "Good Vibrations," an advice column. Dynamite covers profiled three decades in television series (from The Six Million Dollar Man to Beverly Hills, 90210), cartoons (from "Snoopy" (Peanuts) to "Garfield"), movie stars (from Bruce Lee to River Phoenix), music stars (from KISS, John Denver, or Elvis to Paula Abdul and Rick Springfield), and other assorted themes.

In addition to items on the back covers to punch out or assemble (such as  puzzles, games, postcards, mobiles, bookmarks, or masks), Dynamite also included bonus inserts, such as fold-out posters, greeting cards, calendars, or records.  Often the magazine would contain additional bonus inserts such as baseball cards, stickers, or glow-in-the-dark items. Occasional 3-D posters with glasses were also popular, featuring images such as King Kong, skateboarding, and outer space.

The magazine's reader input included an invitation for readers to send in their own "Bummers". Dynamite offered a $5.00 royalty for any bummer it accepted and an incidental note that readers never have to draw the accompanying picture.

 Cover stories 

{| class="wikitable sortable" style="margin:auto;"
|-
! style="background-color:#CCCCFF; width:050px;" | Issue
! style="background-color:#CCCCFF; width:050px;" | Volume
! style="background-color:#CCCCFF; width:050px;" | Number
! style="background-color:#CCCCFF; width:150px;" | Date
! style="background-color:#CCCCFF; width:500px;" | Cover Story
! style="background-color:#CCCCFF; width:050px;" | Notes
|-
| align="center" | 1 
|
|
| align="center" | 
| Dynamite Meets M*A*S*H!
|
|-
| align="center" | 2 
|
|
| align="center" | 
| Dynamite and the Seven Waltons
|
|-
| align="center" | 3
|
|
| align="center" | 
| A Visit to the MADhouse: A New Dynamite Reader – Ecch!
|
|-
| align="center" | 4 
|
|
| align="center" | 
| The Love Bug Returns: Herbie Tells All
|
|-
| align="center" | 5 
|
|
| align="center" | 
| Born Free: Dynamite gets thrown to the lions!
|
|-
| align="center" | 6 
|
|
| align="center" |  
| This Is Your Life, Snoopy
|
|-
| align="center" | 7 
|
|
| align="center" | 
| All About All in the Family
|
|-
| align="center" | 8
|
|
| align="center" | 
| Inside The Six Million Dollar Man
|
|-
| align="center" | 9
|
|
| align="center" | 
| John Denver and Dynamite: Farrrr-out
|
|-
| align="center" | 10
|
|
| align="center" | 
| "Now that's what I call DY-NO-MITE!"
| 
|-
| align="center" | 11
|
|
| align="center" | 
| Little House on the Prairie: A Big Story!
|
|-
| align="center" | 12
|
|
| align="center" | 
| Welcome to the Dynamite Monster Bash!
|
|-
| align="center" | 13
|
|
| align="center" | 
| Dynamite Visits TV's Land of the Lost!
|
|-
| align="center" | 14
|
|
| align="center" | 
| Inside Disney World!  What it's really like!
|
|-
| align="center" | 15
|
|
| align="center" | 
| The Monster Hall of Fame: Enter If You Dare!
|
|-
| align="center" | 16
|
|
| align="center" | 
| TV '76: A Dawn Good Season!
|
|-
| align="center" | 17
|
|
| align="center" | 
| Bruce Lee Lives!
|
|-
| align="center" | 18
|
|
| align="center" | 
| Invisible Man: TV's Most Outtasite Character!
|
|-
| align="center" | 19
|
|
| align="center" | 
| Attention!  Attention!  New Men on M*A*S*H
|
|-
| align="center" | 20
|
|
| align="center" | 
| Cher!
|
|-
| align="center" | 21
|
|
| align="center" | 
| J. J. In A Movie!  Dyn-o-mite!
|
|-
| align="center" | 22
|
|
| align="center" | 
| Face To Face With Fonzie!
|
|-
| align="center" | 23
|
|
| align="center" | 
| Meet The Sweat Hogs
|
|-
| align="center" | 24
|
|
| align="center" | 
| Let's Go To The Hop!  Special Dynamite Fifties Party Issue!
|
|-
| align="center" | 25
|
|
| align="center" | 
| Space: 1999 Takes Off!
|
|-
| align="center" | 26
|
|
| align="center" | 
| Welcome to the San Diego Zoo
|
|-
| align="center" | 27
|
|
| align="center" | 
| Catching Up With The Bionic Woman!
|
|-
| align="center" | 28
|
|
| align="center" | 
| A Dynamite Double Feature!  Laverne and Shirley And King Kong!
|
|-
| align="center" | 29
|
|
| align="center" | 
| The Six Million Dollar Man vs. The Bionic Woman!
|
|-
| align="center" | 30
|
|
| align="center" | 
| Dynamite Meets Donny And Marie!
|
|-
| align="center" | 31
|
|
| align="center" | 
| The Bay City Rollers: An Exclusive Interview!
|
|-
| align="center" | 32
|
|
| align="center" | 
| Fonzie and Pinky Face the Future!
|
|-
| align="center" | 33
|
|
| align="center" | 
| A Dynamite Duo – The Captain And Tennille!
|
|-
| align="center" | 34
|
|
| align="center" | 
| John Travolta: Barbarino and Beyond!
|
|-
| align="center" | 35
|
|
| align="center" | 
| Charlie Brown, Superstar!
|
|-
| align="center" | 36
|
|
| align="center" | 
| What's Happening is What's Happening!!
|
|-
| align="center" | 37
|
|
| align="center" | July 1977
| Bob Hegyes is a Real Person!
| align="center" | 
|-
| align="center" | 38
| align="center" | 1
| align="center" | 1
| align="center" | July 1977
| Mark Fidrych: Big Bird of Baseball
| align="center" | 
|-
| align="center" | 39
| align="center" | 1
| align="center" | 2
| align="center" | August 1977
| The Return of The Brady Bunch!
|
|-
| align="center" | 40
| align="center" | 1
| align="center" | 3
| align="center" | September 1977
| Farrah!
|
|-
| align="center" | 41
| align="center" | 1
| align="center" | 4
| align="center" | October 1977
| The Hardy Boys: A Dynamite Detective Story!
|
|-
| align="center" | 42
| align="center" | 1
| align="center" | 5
| align="center" | November 1977
| Sylvester Stallone: What's next for the star of Rocky?
|
|-
| align="center" | 43
| align="center" | 1
| align="center" | 6
| align="center" | December 1977
| Catching Up With Logan's Run!
|
|-
| align="center" | 44
| align="center" | 1
| align="center" | 7
| align="center" | January 1978
| Star Wars And Shaun - Top Stars of the Year!
|
|-
| align="center" | 45
| align="center" | 1
| align="center" | 8
| align="center" | February 1978
| Meet Kristy McNichol!
|
|-
| align="center" | 46
| align="center" | 1
| align="center" | 9
| align="center" | March 1978
| Kate Jackson
|
|-
| align="center" | 47
| align="center" | 1
| align="center" | 10
| align="center" | April 1978
| Happy Birthday, MAD!
|
|-
| align="center" | 48
| align="center" | 1
| align="center" | 11
| align="center" | May 1978
| Shields And Yarnell: Wind 'Em Up and Laugh
|
|-
| align="center" | 49
| align="center" | 1
| align="center" | 12
| align="center" | June 1978
| Cheryl Ladd
|
|-
| align="center" | 50
| align="center" | 2
| align="center" | 1
| align="center" |July 1978
| The Best of Dynamite!
|
|-
| align="center" | 51
| align="center" | 2
| align="center" | 2
| align="center" | August 1978
| Special Hollywood Issue!
|
|-
| align="center" | 52
| align="center" | 2
| align="center" | 3
| align="center" | September 1978
| Lou Ferrigno: More than just a Hulk of muscle!
|
|-
| align="center" | 53
| align="center" | 2
| align="center" | 4
| align="center" | October 1978
| The Bee Gees vs. The Beatles!  Who's the Greatest?
|
|-
| align="center" | 54
| align="center" | 2
| align="center" | 5
| align="center" | November 1978
| The Secrets of Battlestar Galactica!
|
|-
| align="center" | 55
| align="center" | 2
| align="center" | 6
| align="center" | December 1978
| Cruising With The Love Boat Crew!
|
|-
| align="center" | 56
| align="center" | 2
| align="center" | 7
| align="center" | January 1979
| Mork And Mindy: TV's Out-of-this-World Comedy!
|
|-
| align="center" | 57
| align="center" | 2
| align="center" | 8
| align="center" | February 1979
| Meet the guys from CHiPs!
|
|-
| align="center" | 58
| align="center" | 2
| align="center" | 9
| align="center" | March 1979
| Kristy McNichol & Leif Garrett
|
|-
| align="center" | 59
| align="center" | 2
| align="center" | 10
| align="center" | April 1979
| Dynamite Discoveries of the Year!  Christopher Reeve And Lynn-Holly Johnson
|
|-
| align="center" | 60
| align="center" | 2
| align="center" | 11
| align="center" | May 1979
| Kermit And Miss Piggy: A Muppet love story?
|
|-
| align="center" | 61
| align="center" | 2
| align="center" | 12
| align="center" | June 1979
| Robin Williams: More than Mork!
|
|-
| align="center" | 62
| align="center" | 3
| align="center" | 1
| align="center" | July 1979
| All In The Family - Monster Style!
|
|-
| align="center" | 63
| align="center" | 3
| align="center" | 2
| align="center" | August 1979
| Special Science Fiction Issue!  First Preview of Star Wars II!
|
|-
| align="center" | 64
| align="center" | 3
| align="center" | 3
| align="center" | September 1979
| Face to Face With Erik Estrada
|
|-
| align="center" | 65
| align="center" | 3
| align="center" | 4
| align="center" | October 1979
| Gary Coleman: TV's Little Big Man
|
|-
| align="center" | 66
| align="center" | 3
| align="center" | 5
| align="center" | November 1979
| The Dukes of Hazzard
|
|-
| align="center" | 67
| align="center" | 3
| align="center" | 6
| align="center" | December 1979
| Steve Martin: A Wild and Crazy Guy!
|
|-
| align="center" | 68
| align="center" | 3
| align="center" | 7
| align="center" | January 1980
| Mork and His New Pals!
|
|-
| align="center" | 69
| align="center" | 3
| align="center" | 8
| align="center" | February 1980
| Buck Rogers: Then and Now!
|
|-
| align="center" | 70
| align="center" | 3
| align="center" | 9
| align="center" | March 1980
| Live From New York: It's Gilda Radner!
|
|-
| align="center" | 71
| align="center" | 3
| align="center" | 10
| align="center" | April 1980
| B.J. And The Bear: A Special Talk with Greg Evigan!
|
|-
| align="center" | 72
| align="center" | 3
| align="center" | 11
| align="center" | May 1980
| Benji: Hollywood's Top Dog!
|
|-
| align="center" | 73
| align="center" | 3
| align="center" | 12
| align="center" | June 1980
| Meet John Schneider!
|
|-
| align="center" | 74
| align="center" | 4
| align="center" | 1
| align="center" | July 1980
| Miss Piggy: A Real Ham at Heart
|
|-
| align="center" | 75
| align="center" | 4
| align="center" | 2
| align="center" | August 1980
| TV's Top Reruns: The Brady Bunch and More!
|
|-
| align="center" | 76
| align="center" | 4
| align="center" | 3
| align="center" | September 1980
| The Empire Strikes Back
|
|-
| align="center" | 77
| align="center" | 4
| align="center" | 4
| align="center" | October 1980
| Shaun Cassidy in Breaking Away
|
|-
| align="center" | 78
| align="center" | 4
| align="center" | 5
| align="center" | November 1980
| That's Incredible! 
|
|-
| align="center" | 79
| align="center" | 4
| align="center" | 6
| align="center" | December 1980
| Dynamite Spends A Happy Day With Scott Baio!
|
|-
| align="center" | 80
| align="center" | 4
| align="center" | 7
| align="center" | January 1981
| Meet Tom Wopat of The Dukes of Hazzard!
|
|-
| align="center" | 81
| align="center" | 4
| align="center" | 8
| align="center" | February 1981
| Gary Coleman Grows Up and Stars in a New Movie!
|
|-
| align="center" | 82
| align="center" | 4
| align="center" | 9
| align="center" | March 1981
| Buck Rogers and Wilma: TV's Fun Couple of the Future!
|
|-
| align="center" | 83
| align="center" | 4
| align="center" | 10
| align="center" | April 1981
| Count Morbida's Monstrous Movie Quiz
|
|-
| align="center" | 84
| align="center" | 4
| align="center" | 11
| align="center" | May 1981
| Bugs Bunny Is Back!
|
|-
| align="center" | 85
| align="center" | 4
| align="center" | 12
| align="center" | June 1981
| The Great Muppet Caper
|
|-
| align="center" | 86
| align="center" | 5
| align="center" | 1
| align="center" | July 1981
| TV Kids - Then and Now!
|
|-
| align="center" | 87
| align="center" | 5
| align="center" | 2
| align="center" | August 1981
| Special Collector's Issue - All About Bummers!
|
|-
| align="center" | 88
| align="center" | 5
| align="center" | 3
| align="center" | September 1981
| |The Greatest American Hero and Superman, Too!
|
|-
| align="center" | 89
| align="center" | 5
| align="center" | 4
| align="center" | October 1981
| Dynamite Dares to Ride With the Dukes!
|
|-
| align="center" | 90
| align="center" | 5
| align="center" | 5
| align="center" | November 1981
| Master Magician The Amazing Randi Tells the Truth About the Fakes!
|
|-
| align="center" | 91
| align="center" | 5
| align="center" | 6
| align="center" | December 1981
| Happy Tenth Birthday, M*A*S*H!
|
|-
| align="center" | 92
| align="center" | 5
| align="center" | 7
| align="center" | January 1982
| Meet Rick Springfield!
|
|-
| align="center" | 93
| align="center" | 5
| align="center" | 8
| align="center" | February 1982
| Lee Majors in The Fall Guy: Who Does the Stuntman's Stunts?
|
|-
| align="center" | 94
| align="center" | 5
| align="center" | 9
| align="center" | March 1982
| Melissa Gilbert All Grown Up!
|
|-
| align="center" | 95
| align="center" | 5
| align="center" | 10
| align="center" | April 1982
| Lisa Whelchel Tells the Facts of Her Life!
|
|-
| align="center" | 96
| align="center" | 5
| align="center" | 11
| align="center" | May 1982
| Meet Mr. Merlin's Magic Helper Clark Brandon!
|
|-
| align="center" | 97
| align="center" | 5
| align="center" | 12
| align="center" | June 1982
| Annie: The Making of the Movie
|
|-
| align="center" | 98
| align="center" | 6
| align="center" | 1
| align="center" | July 1982
| A Close Encounter with E.T.
|
|-
| align="center" | 99
| align="center" | 6
| align="center" | 2
| align="center" | August 1982
| Sylvester Stallone: A Chat with the Rocky III Champ!
|
|-
| align="center" | 100
| align="center" | 6
| align="center" | 3
| align="center" | September 1982
| Joanie Loves Chachi: And Dynamite Loves Them Both!
|
|-
| align="center" | 101
| align="center" | 6
| align="center" | 4
| align="center" | October 1982
| E.T.: Meet the Creature
|
|-
| align="center" | 102
| align="center" | 6
| align="center" | 5
| align="center" | November 1982
| |The Dark Crystal: An All-New Muppet Creature Feature
|
|-
| align="center" | 103
| align="center" | 6
| align="center" | 6
| align="center" | December 1982
| Meet Garfield: Heavyweight Champion of Cartoon Cats
|
|-
| align="center" | 104
| align="center" | 6
| align="center" | 7
| align="center" | January 1983
| Matt Dillon: Tells How His Good Looks Get in His Way
|
|-
| align="center" | 105
| align="center" | 6
| align="center" | 8
| align="center" | February 1983
| Square Pegs: The Hottest TV Hit Of The Year!
|
|-
| align="center" | 106
| align="center" | 6
| align="center" | 9
| align="center" | March 1983
| MTV: All About TV's Rock and Roll Station
|
|-
| align="center" | 107
| align="center" | 6
| align="center" | 10
| align="center" | April 1983
| Ricky Schroder: Meet the star of Silver Spoons
|
|-
| align="center" | 108
| align="center" | 6 
| align="center" | 11
| align="center" | May 1983
| Meet Kim Fields: Star of The Facts of Life
|
|-
| align="center" | 109
| align="center" | 6 
| align="center" | 12
| align="center" | June 1983
| The Return of the Jedi: A talk with the man inside C-3PO!
|
|-
| align="center" | 110
| align="center" | 7 
| align="center" | 1
| align="center" | July 1983
| Dynamite's Greatest Hits
|
|-
| align="center" | 111
| align="center" | 7 
| align="center" | 2
| align="center" | August 1983
| Meet David Hasselhoff: Knight Rider's Driving Force
|
|-
| align="center" | 112
| align="center" | 7
| align="center" | 3
| align="center" | September 1983
| Knight Rider is Dynamite!  An Exclusive interview with David Hasselhoff
|
|-
| align="center" | 113
| align="center" | 7 
| align="center" | 4
| align="center" | October 1983
| Michael Jackson: A Thriller for Music Fans
| align="center" | 
|-
| align="center" | 114
| align="center" | 7
| align="center" | 4
| align="center" | November 1983
| Luke Skywalker And Princess Leia: What's Next After Jedi?
| align="center" | 
|-
| align="center" | 115
| align="center" | 7
| align="center" | 5
| align="center" | December 1983
| Men at Work
|
|-
| align="center" | 116
| align="center" | 7
| align="center" | 6
| align="center" | January 1984
| Meet "Mr. T": His Look Is Tough - His Heart Is Tender
|
|-
| align="center" | 117
| align="center" | 7
| align="center" | 7
| align="center" | February 1984
| Gary Coleman: A Talk With TV's Top Teen
|
|-
| align="center" | 118
| align="center" | 7
| align="center" | 8
| align="center" | March 1984
| Meet Michael J. Fox, Star of Family Ties!
|
|-
| align="center" | 119
| align="center" | 7
| align="center" | 9
| align="center" | April 1984
| Mr. T - As You've Never Seen Him!
|
|-
| align="center" | 120
| align="center" | 7
| align="center" | 10
| align="center" | May 1984
| Harrison Ford: The Raiders Star Returns
|
|-
| align="center" | 121
| align="center" | 7
| align="center" | 11
| align="center" | June 1984
| Supergirl: From the Comics to the Silver Screen!
|
|-
| align="center" | 122
| align="center" | 7
| align="center" | 12
| align="center" | July 1984
| Dynamite Goes to the Movies
|
|-
| align="center" | 123
| align="center" | 8
| align="center" | 1
| align="center" | September 1984
| Tops On TV: Webster's Emmanuel Lewis
| align="center" | 
|-
| align="center" | 124
| align="center" | 8
| align="center" | 2
| align="center" | October 1984
| Scott Baio is Charles in Charge!
|
|-
| align="center" | 125
| align="center" | 8
| align="center" | 3
| align="center" | November 1984
| Heathcliff!
|
|-
| align="center" | 126
| align="center" | 8
| align="center" | 4
| align="center" | January 1985
| Backstage at the Bill Cosby Show
|
|-
| align="center" | 127
| align="center" | 8
| align="center" | 5
| align="center" | February 1985
| Duran Duran
|
|-
| align="center" | 128
| align="center" | 8
| align="center" | 6
| align="center" | March 1985
| Ralph Macchio: The Karate Kid Star is a Hit!
|
|-
| align="center" | 129
| align="center" | 9
| align="center" | 1
| align="center" | September 1985
| How Success Changed The Cosby Show Kids!
|
|-
| align="center" | 130
| align="center" | 9
| align="center" | 2
| align="center" | October 1985
| Cartoon Cavalcade
|
|-
| align="center" | 131
| align="center" | 9
| align="center" | 3
| align="center" | November 1985
| Garfield
|
|-
| align="center" | 132
| align="center" | 9
| align="center" | 4
| align="center" | January 1986
| Punky Brewster!
|
|-
| align="center" | 133
| align="center" | 9
| align="center" | 5
| align="center" | February 1986
| Bruce Springsteen
|
|-
| align="center" | 134
| align="center" | 9
| align="center" | 6
| align="center" | March 1986
| Back To The Present With Michael J. Fox!
|
|-
| align="center" | 135
| align="center" | 10
| align="center" | 1
| align="center" | September 1986
| TV's Favorite Families!
|
|-
| align="center" | 136
| align="center" | 10
| align="center" | 2
| align="center" | October 1986
| Tony Danza
|
|-
| align="center" | 137
| align="center" | 10
| align="center" | 3
| align="center" | November 1986
| Most Popular TV Guys!
|
|-
| align="center" | 138
| align="center" | 10
| align="center" | 4
| align="center" | January 1987
| A Super Michael J. Fox Scrapbook
|
|-
| align="center" | 139
| align="center" | 10
| align="center" | 5
| align="center" | February 1987
| Chart-Topping Ladies Of Rock
|
|-
| align="center" | 140
| align="center" | 10
| align="center" | 6
| align="center" | March 1987
| Meet Star Students From Head of the Class
|
|-
| align="center" | 141
| align="center" | 11
| align="center" | 1
| align="center" | September 1987
| Heard It Through The Grapevine: Exclusive interview with a commercial "star"!
| align="center" | 
|-
| align="center" | 142
| align="center" | 11
| align="center" | 2
| align="center" | October 1987
| Alyssa Milano
|
|-
| align="center" | 143
| align="center" | 11
| align="center" | 3
| align="center" | November 1987
| Kirk Cameron
|
|-
| align="center" | 144
| align="center" | 11
| align="center" | 4
| align="center" | January 1988
| Show Biz Siblings: Featuring River Phoenix And Family!
|
|-
| align="center" | 145
| align="center" | 11
| align="center" | 5
| align="center" | March 1988
| This Is Your Life, Garfield!
|
|-
| align="center" | 146
| align="center" | 12
| align="center" | 1
| align="center" | September 1988
| A Dynamite Kirk Cameron Photo Album!
|
|-
| align="center" | 147
| align="center" | 12
| align="center" | 2
| align="center" | October 1988
| Who's the Best?  Debbie Gibson vs. Tiffany
|
|-
| align="center" | 148
| align="center" | 12
| align="center" | 3
| align="center" | November 1988
| Hollywood's Top Teen Talents: Corey Haim And Corey Feldman!
|
|-
| align="center" | 149
| align="center" | 12
| align="center" | 4
| align="center" | January 1989
| Johnny Depp - TV's Top Cop Star!
|
|-
| align="center" | 150
| align="center" | 12
| align="center" | 5
| align="center" | March 1989
| A Different World'''s Jasmine Guy
|
|-
| align="center" | 151
| align="center" | 13
| align="center" | 1
| align="center" | September 1989
| Exclusive Interview: The Wonder Years' Fred Savage!
|
|-
| align="center" | 152
| align="center" | 13
| align="center" | 2
| align="center" | October 1989
| Debbie Gibson: Rock's Top Teen!
|  
|-
| align="center" | 153
| align="center" | 13
| align="center" | 3
| align="center" | November 1989
| Dynamite Makes a Full House Call
|
|-
| align="center" | 154
| align="center" | 13
| align="center" | 4
| align="center" | January 1990
| Meet The Kids of Roseanne!
|
|-
| align="center" | 155
| align="center" | 13
| align="center" | 5
| align="center" | March 1990
| Cast Your Vote for Favorite TV Starlet!
|
|-
| align="center" | 156
| align="center" | 14
| align="center" | 1
| align="center" | September 1990
| Paula Abdul!
|
|-
| align="center" | 157
| align="center" | 14
| align="center" | 2
| align="center" | October 1990
| Basketball Big Shot, Michael "Air" Jordan!
|
|-
| align="center" | 158
| align="center" | 14
| align="center" | 3
| align="center" | November 1990
| The Simpsons!
|
|-
| align="center" | 159
| align="center" | 14
| align="center" | 4
| align="center" | January 1991
| New Kids on the Block and a Galaxy of Maurice Starr's Stars!
|
|-
| align="center" | 160
| align="center" | 14
| align="center" | 5
| align="center" | March 1991
| Candace Cameron!
|
|-
| align="center" | 161
| align="center" | 15
| align="center" | 1
| align="center" | September 1991
| Will Smith: The Fresh Prince of Bel-Air|
|-
| align="center" | 162
| align="center" | 15
| align="center" | 2
| align="center" | October 1991
| Face to Face With Macaulay Culkin!
|
|-
| align="center" | 163
| align="center" | 15
| align="center" | 3
| align="center" | November 1991
| Family Matters Jaleel (Urkel) White!
|
|-
| align="center" | 164
| align="center" | 15
| align="center" | 4
| align="center" | January 1992
| The Cast of Beverly Hills, 90210|
|-
| align="center" | 165
| align="center" | 15
| align="center" | 5
| align="center" | March 1992
| Julia Roberts! Arnold Schwarzenegger!
|
|-
|}

 See also 
 Paulina Kernberg, author of Dynamite'' magazine's "Good Vibrations" advice column
 List of defunct American magazines

Notes 

Children's magazines published in the United States
Defunct magazines published in the United States
Magazines disestablished in 1992
Magazines established in 1974
Magazines published in New York City
Monthly magazines published in the United States
Bimonthly magazines published in the United States